The Feliciano River (Spanish, Arroyo Feliciano) is a river in the Argentine province of Entre Ríos, in the Mesopotamia. It is born on the Lomada del Mocoretá, on the northeast of the province, east of San José de Feliciano, and flows west-southwest across the province. Its course receives the waters of several streams, and after  it empties into the Paraná River near Piedras Blancas.

See also
 List of rivers of Argentina

References

 Turismo Entre Ríos. Geografía, relieve y límites de Entre Ríos.

Rivers of Argentina
Rivers of Entre Ríos Province
Tributaries of the Paraná River